Ust'Nyukzha (Russian:Усть-Нюкжа) is a rural locality (an inhabited locality) located in Tyndinsky District in Amur Oblast, Russia. As of the 2010 census, the population was 573.

Geography 
It is located by the Nyukzha river, near its confluence with the Olyokma.

References

Rural localities in Tyndinsky District